Someone to Watch Over Me is the third album by Scottish singer Susan Boyle, released on 7 November 2011 in the United Kingdom and 1 November 2011 in the United States. The album has been described as a "diverse mix of music" which includes songs inspired by the stories of Boyle's fans who write letters to her.

Background
Boyle announced the album title and release date on 1 September 2011, on the semi-final results show of America's Got Talent, after performing a track from "You Have to Be There". The song was written by ABBA members Benny Andersson and Björn Ulvaeus, from their musical Kristina från Duvemåla. After Boyle performed on America's Got Talent she said: "I was also a little nervous introducing something new. America's Got Talent - it's where I started with my first album, so it was wonderful to be back and for the support."

Commercial performance
In the United Kingdom, the album debuted in the top position of the UK Albums Chart, her third consecutive album to do so. It sold 72,000 copies in its debut week. As of 22 December 2011, the album has sold 416,000 copies in the US.

In Australia, the album debuted in the top position of the Australian Album Chart, so far it has been certified double platinum.

In the United States, the album debuted at number four on the Billboard 200, becoming her third top five album on the chart. It sold 132,000 copies in its first week. In its second week, the album was number seven selling 72,000 copies.

Track listing

The album is also available in a Special Edition that features a bonus DVD with music videos of the songs "You Have to Be There", "Unchained Melody", "Autumn Leaves", and "Perfect Day".

Charts

Weekly charts

Year-end charts

Decade-end charts

Certifications and sales

Release history

References

Susan Boyle albums
2011 albums
Syco Music albums
Columbia Records albums